FC Skala Stryi may refer to:

FC Skala Stryi (1911), a Ukrainian football team based in Stryi, Lviv oblast, dissolved in 2009
FC Skala Stryi (2004), a current Ukrainian football team from Stryi, Lviv oblast